"Later" is a song by British recording artist Example. It was released as a single on 12 August 2016. The song was written and produced by Example himself with the collaboration of Andy Sheldrake and Kai Kai Smith.

Background and release
In May 2016, Example confirmed that the second single from his untitled sixth album would be "Later" and would be a return to "classic Example", citing "Changed the Way You Kissed Me" as a reference in an interview with Russell Kane on Virgin Radio. The track had been teased in Twitter and Instagram posts in the week leading up to its release, before being release on 12 August.

Music video
Gleave stated to a fan on Twitter that the music video would be recorded at his performance at the 2016 Boardmasters Festival on 13 August.

Track listing

Release history

2016 singles
Example (musician) songs
Epic Records singles